Eucampyla is a monotypic snout moth genus. Its only species, Eucampyla etheiella, is known from Micronesia, the Society Islands and Australia. Both the genus and species were first described by Edward Meyrick in 1882.

The larvae feed on Chromolaena odorata. They attack both young flower buds and mature leaves.

References

Phycitini
Monotypic moth genera
Taxa named by Edward Meyrick
Moths described in 1882
Moths of Oceania
Pyralidae genera